This is a list of all the United States Supreme Court cases from volume 541 of the United States Reports:

External links

2004 in United States case law